Isaac Wilson may refer to:

 Isaac Wilson (physician), FRS, (1757-1844) English Physician to Haslar Naval Hospital and Royal family
 Isaac Wilson (American politician), United States Representative from New York
 Isaac Wilson (English politician) (1822–1899), English industrialist and Liberal Party MP from Middlesbrough
 Isaac Wilson (New Zealand politician) (1840–1901), New Zealand MP